The 2017–18 Winnipeg Jets season was the 19th season for the National Hockey League franchise that was established on June 25, 1997, and the seventh in Winnipeg, since the franchise relocated from Atlanta prior to the start of the 2011–12 NHL season. The Jets clinched their second playoff spot since relocating from Atlanta after beating the Nashville Predators 5–4 in a shootout on March 25, 2018. The Jets finished the season with 114 points, the second-best record in the NHL. Both are the best-ever finishes for both the Thrashers/Jets franchise and any Winnipeg-based NHL team.

On April 11, 2018, the Jets won their first playoff game in franchise history when they defeated the Minnesota Wild 3–2 ending an 8-game playoff losing streak. On April 20, 2018, the team won its first playoff series when they defeated the Wild 5–0 and advanced to the Second Round. They then took the Presidents' Trophy-winning Nashville Predators to seven games to advance to the Western Conference Final – the deepest playoff run for a Winnipeg-based NHL team. The original Jets only got as far as the second round during their run in Winnipeg, in 1985 and 1987. Their season would come to an end during the Western Conference Final where they lost to the Vegas Golden Knights in five games.

Standings

Schedule and results

Pre-season
The pre-season schedule was published on June 12, 2017.

Regular season
The regular season schedule was released on June 22, 2017.

Playoffs

Player statistics
Final Stats
Skaters

Goaltenders

†Denotes player spent time with another team before joining the Jets. Statistics reflect time with the Jets only.
‡Denotes player was traded mid-season. Statistics reflect time with the Jets only.
Bold/italics denotes franchise record.

Transactions
The Jets have been involved in the following transactions during the 2017–18 season.

Trades

Notes:
  The Vegas Golden Knights selected Chris Thorburn in the 2017 NHL Expansion Draft.

Free agents acquired

Free agents lost

Claimed via waivers

Lost via waivers

Lost via retirement

Player signings

Draft picks

Below are the Winnipeg Jets' selections at the 2017 NHL Entry Draft, which was held on June 23 and 24, 2017 at the United Center in Chicago.

Draft notes:
 The Columbus Blue Jackets' first-round pick went to the Winnipeg Jets as the result of a trade on June 21, 2017, that sent a first-round pick in 2017, a third-round pick in 2019 to Vegas and ensured that Vegas selected Chris Thorburn in the 2017 NHL Expansion Draft from Winnipeg in exchange for this pick.
 The Montreal Canadiens' seventh-round pick went to the Winnipeg Jets as the result of a trade on June 25, 2016 that sent a seventh-round pick in 2016 to Montreal in exchange for this pick.

References

Winnipeg Jets seasons
Winnipeg Jets
Winni